javac (pronounced "java-see") is the primary Java compiler included in the Java Development Kit (JDK) from Oracle Corporation. Martin Odersky implemented the GJ compiler, and his implementation became the basis for javac.

The compiler accepts source code conforming to the Java language specification (JLS) and produces Java bytecode conforming to the Java Virtual Machine Specification (JVMS).

javac is itself written in Java. The compiler can also be invoked programmatically.

History
On 13 November 2006, Sun's HotSpot Java virtual machine (JVM) and Java Development Kit (JDK) were made available under the GPL license.

Since version 0.95, GNU Classpath, a free implementation of the Java Class Library, supports compiling and running javac using the Classpath runtime — GNU Interpreter for Java (GIJ) — and compiler — GNU Compiler for Java (GCJ) — and also allows one to compile the GNU Classpath class library, tools and examples with javac itself.

See also

 Java compiler – for a general presentation of Java compilers, and a list of other existing alternative compilers.
 Java Platform
 OpenJDK

References

External links
 The Compiler Group
 JSR 199 Java Compiler API Java Specification Request for invoking the Java compiler from a Java program
 Mercurial repository
 Java Language Specification

Java compilers